is a Japanese artistic gymnast. She competed for the national team at the 2008 Summer Olympics in the Women's artistic team all-around and the 2012 Summer Olympics in the Women's artistic team all-around.

References

Japanese female artistic gymnasts
Living people
Olympic gymnasts of Japan
Gymnasts at the 2008 Summer Olympics
Gymnasts at the 2012 Summer Olympics
Universiade medalists in gymnastics
1990 births
Gymnasts from Tokyo
Universiade gold medalists for Japan
Universiade silver medalists for Japan
Medalists at the 2011 Summer Universiade
Medalists at the 2013 Summer Universiade
Medalists at the 2015 Summer Universiade
21st-century Japanese women